Ragnarsdrápa (Ragnar's Poem) is a skaldic poem said to have been composed in honour of the Scandinavian hero, Ragnar Lodbrok, but likely actually addressed to some later Ragnar. It is attributed to the oldest known skald, Bragi Boddason, who lived in the 9th century, and was composed for the Swedish king Björn at Haugi. Bragi describes the images on a decorated shield which Ragnar had given to him. The images included:

the attack of Hamdir and Sorli against King Jörmunrekkr
the never-ending battle between Heðinn and Hǫgni.
Thor's fishing for Jörmungandr (The Midgard Serpent) 
Gefjun's ploughing of Zealand from the soil of Sweden

The extant fragments of Ragnarsdrápa are preserved in Snorri Sturluson's Prose Edda. The episodes of Hamdir and Sorli and Heðinn and Hǫgni are explicitly ascribed to Ragnarsdrápa while the other parts are inferred by scholars to belong to the same poem, describing the images on the four quarters of the shield, in four stanzas each with, presumably, a lost refrain.

The poem is often compared with Húsdrápa and Haustlöng, which also describe artworks depicting mythological scenes. Like Haustlöng, it uses archaic and complex kennings in a manner which strains the syntax. Although the dróttkvætt metre violates some of the rules developed later, it is well executed; this and the complexity of language demonstrate that there had already been considerable development of skaldic verse.

See also
 Ekphrasis

References

External links
Ragnarsdrápa in Old Norse in Finnur Jónsson's edition, at Kulturformidlingen norrøne tekster og kvad, Norway.
Two editions of the original text (copy on Wayback Machine)
The first two half-stanzas read aloud
Translation and discussion of six half-stanzas

Cultural depictions of Ragnar Lodbrok
Skaldic poems
Works based on art